Manpeda is a 1971 Indian Malayalam film, directed by P. M. A. Azeez and produced by Bahadoor. The film stars Jayabharathi, Jesey, T. S. Muthaiah and Prem Navas in the lead roles. The film had musical score by M. S. Baburaj.

Cast
Jayabharathi
Jesey
T. S. Muthaiah
Prem Nawas
Bahadoor
Nellikode Bhaskaran
Raveendran

Soundtrack
The music was composed by M. S. Baburaj and the lyrics were written by Sreekumaran Thampi.

References

External links
 

1971 films
1970s Malayalam-language films